Flemming is a surname and a male given name referring, like the more common Fleming, to an inhabitant (or descendant thereof) of Flanders, a region overlapping parts of modern Belgium, France, and the Netherlands. Notable people with the name include:

Surname 
 Aida McAnn Flemming, Canadian teacher and writer
 Arthur Flemming, American government official
 Bill Flemming, American sportscaster
 Brett Flemming, Canadian ice hockey player
 Brian Flemming, American film director, playwright, and activist
 Catherine Flemming, German actress
 Dave Flemming, American sportscaster
 Georg Detlev von Flemming, Saxon-Polish general
 Heino Heinrich Graf von Flemming, Saxon and Brandenburg Field Marshal
 Hugh John Flemming, Canadian politician
 James Kidd Flemming, Canadian businessman and politician
 Jane Flemming, Austrian track and field athlete
 Jimmy Flemming, U.S. Virgin Islands sprinter
 John Flemming, English economist
 John Flemming (racing driver), Canadian racing driver
 Margot Flemming, Canadian curler
 Marilies Flemming, Austrian politician
 Michael Anthony Flemming, British physicist
 Paul Flemming, Canadian curler
 Peter Flemming, Canadian actor
 Peter Flemming (artist), Canadian installation artist
 Robert Flemming, English cleric
 Robert F. Flemming Jr., American inventor and sailor
 Sarah Mae Flemming, American civil rights activist
 Scott Flemming, American basketball coach
 Ted Flemming (footballer), Australian rules footballer
 Ted Flemming (politician), Canadian politician
 Thomas Flemming, German swimmer
 Walther Flemming, German biologist
 Will Flemming, American sportscaster
 Zian Flemming, Dutch footballer

Given name 
 Flemming Christensen, Danish footballer
 Flemming Flindt, Danish choreographer
 Flemming Hansen (disambiguation), several people
 Flemming Møller Mortensen (born 1963), Danish politician
 Flemming Povlsen, Danish footballer
 Flemming Rasmussen, Danish producer
 Flemming Østergaard, Danish businessman

Notes 

Danish masculine given names